Kickapoo Lake is a private lake in Hinds County, Mississippi, USA. Until the mid 1980s, Kickapoo Lake was the water feature for the former Boy Scouts of America summer camp Camp Kickapoo, the camp for BSA members in the Andrew Jackson Council of Mississippi. The camp was closed with the opening of the Warren A. Hood Scout Reservation in Copiah County, Mississippi. The camp and lake are now privately owned.

Kickapoo Lake was named after the Kickapoo people.

References

Reservoirs in Mississippi
Bodies of water of Hinds County, Mississippi
Mississippi placenames of Native American origin